Sychovka is a rural locality (a selo) and the administrative center of Sychovsky Selsoviet of Svobodnensky District, Amur Oblast, Russia. The population was 582 as of 2018. There are 9  streets.

Geography 
Sychovka is located 67 km southwest of Svobodny (the district's administrative centre) by road. Zagornaya Selitba is the nearest rural locality.

References 

Rural localities in Svobodnensky District